Krzysztof Kasprzak (born 18 July 1984 in Leszno, Poland) is an international motorcycle speedway rider from Poland, who became World Under-21 Champion in 2005 and won the silver medal during the 2014 Speedway Grand Prix. He also won five World team titles.

Career summary
Kasprzak became the European Champion in 2003 after winning the 2003 Individual Speedway European Championship. He also made his British speedway debut after joining Poole Pirates. The following year in 2004, he broke into the Poland team, representing them in the 2004 Speedway World Cup. In 2005, he won European Pairs Championship and Under-21 World Cup for Poland.

He had been a wild card rider in four Speedway Grand Prix, in 2004 and 2007 at Bydgoszcz and in 2005 and 2006 at Wrocław and then became a permanent rider for the 2008 series after being awarded a wild card place. His second place in the 2007 Polish Grand Prix was one of the reasons he was given the chance. 

In 2007, he rode for Lakeside Hammers during the 2007 Elite League speedway season but the season highlight was winning his first major team honour as Poland won the 2007 Speedway World Cup. He top scored during the event with 14 points.

After joining Belle Vue Aces for the 2009 Elite League speedway season he top scored for the Manchester club and then won his second world team title, when Poland won the 2009 Speedway World Cup. The following season he was instrumental in helping Coventry Bees win the Elite League title during the 2010 Elite League speedway season. In 2011, he won his third world team title after winning the 2011 Speedway World Cup. He also joined Birmingham Bullets for the 2011 season.

In September 2012, during the Speedway Grand Prix Qualification he won the GP Challenge, which ensured that he claimed a permanent slot for the 2013 Grand Prix.

During the 2012 Elite League speedway season he helped Poole Pirates win the Knockout Cup and Elite Shield. In 2013, he returned to Coventry Bees for the 2013 season before leaving British Speedway for two years, while he competed in the 2014 and 2015 Grand Prix series. He won a fourth world team title in 2013 and then in 2014, he achieved his greatest success when finishing runner-up to Greg Hancock in the World Championship. The 2014 feat included three grand prix wins (European, Latvian and, Polish).

In 2016, he returned to the Bees team for the third time, for the 2016 Elite League campaign and finished with a respectable 7.91 average. During 2016 he won his fifth world team title after winning the 2016 Speedway World Cup. In 2017, he was released by Poole after poor form and joined the Rye House Rockets for the SGB Premiership 2017 and SGB Premiership 2018 seasons.

In 2023, he returned to British speedway after signing for King's Lynn Stars for the SGB Premiership 2023.

Family
He is a son of former Polish national speedway team member Zenon Kasprzak. Brother Robert is also a speedway rider.

Major results

World individual Championship
2004 Speedway Grand Prix - 34th
2005 Speedway Grand Prix - 22nd
2006 Speedway Grand Prix - 20th
2007 Speedway Grand Prix - 17th
2008 Speedway Grand Prix - 14th
2012 Speedway Grand Prix - 18th
2013 Speedway Grand Prix - 10th
2014 Speedway Grand Prix - 2nd including (European, Latvian and, Polish) grand prix wins
2015 Speedway Grand Prix - 15th
2016 Speedway Grand Prix - 20th
2017 Speedway Grand Prix - 24th
2018 Speedway Grand Prix - 19th
2021 Speedway Grand Prix - 16th

World team Championships
2004 Speedway World Cup - 4th
2006 Speedway World Cup - 5th
2007 Speedway World Cup - Winner
2009 Speedway World Cup - Winner
2011 Speedway World Cup - Winner
2013 Speedway World Cup - Winner
2014 Speedway World Cup - 2nd
2016 Speedway World Cup - Winner

Speedway Grand Prix results

See also
List of Speedway Grand Prix riders

References

1984 births
Living people
Polish speedway riders
Speedway World Cup champions
Team Speedway Junior World Champions
Individual Speedway European Champions
European Pairs Speedway Champions
Belle Vue Aces riders
Birmingham Brummies riders
Coventry Bees riders
King's Lynn Stars riders
Lakeside Hammers riders
Poole Pirates riders
Rye House Rockets riders
People from Leszno
Sportspeople from Greater Poland Voivodeship